The 1944 SANFL Grand Final was an Australian rules football championship game. It was held during World War II and was contested between merged clubs.  -North beat Port–Torrens 61 to 55.

References 

SANFL Grand Finals
SANFL Grand Final, 1944